"Tangerine Dream" is the first single by Do As Infinity, released in 1999. "Faces" and "Simple Minds" were never included in any album.

This song was included in the band's compilation albums Do the Best and Do the A-side.

Track listing
"Tangerine Dream"
"Wings"
"Faces"
"Simple Minds"
"Tangerine Dream" (Instrumental)
"Wings" (Instrumental)
"Faces" (Instrumental)
"Simple Minds" (Instrumental)

Chart positions

References

External links
 "Tangerine Dream"at Avex Network 
 "Tangerine Dream" at Oricon

1999 singles
Do As Infinity songs
Songs written by Dai Nagao
1999 songs
Avex Trax singles